The Christopher S. Bond Bridge is a highway bridge crossing the Missouri River at Hermann, Missouri.  The bridge was opened to vehicle traffic on July 23, 2007, replacing an adjacent span opened in 1930.  Florence Mundwiller Kelley, who cut the ribbon for the old Hermann bridge when she was 10 years old, also got to cut the ribbon for the new bridge.

The bridge consists of two 12-foot driving lanes, two 10-foot shoulders, and an 8-foot bicycle/pedestrian lane. The bike lane, which was opened in 2008 after approach construction and demolition of the previous bridge was completed, improved access between the town and the nearby Katy Trail State Park.

The bridge is named after Christopher "Kit" Bond, former Missouri United States Senator, and was officially dedicated October 12, 2007.

References
 "New Highway 19 Missouri River bridge is open", Hermann Advertiser Courier, July 25, 2007

External links
 Missouri Department of Transportation Senator Christopher S. Bond Bridge bridge information page

Bridges completed in 1930
Bridges completed in 2007
Buildings and structures in Gasconade County, Missouri
Road bridges in Missouri
Girder bridges in the United States